Igor Șarov (born 3 November 1967) is a Moldovan proffessor, historian, editor and former politician who previously held the office of Minister of Education, Culture and Research in the Chicu Cabinet.

He was a member of the Commission for the Study of the Communist Dictatorship in Moldova.

References 

1939 births
Living people
Moldovan historians
Moldovan Ministers of Education
Academic staff of Moldova State University
Members of the Commission for the Study of the Communist Dictatorship in Moldova
Moldova State University alumni